The Republic of Nauru originally consisted of 169 villages; by 1900 these were already partly abandoned, uninhabited or destroyed.  With the increasing population growth the single villages  merged into a single connected settlement, which today is spread out around the entire coastal  strip.

The village names are from the book Nauru - Ergebnisse der Südseeexpedition by Paul Hambruch, who researched on the island during the Hamburger Südsee-Expedition 1908–1910. The village names were changed following the orthographic reform of the Nauruan language of 1939.

List

See also 
 Geography of Nauru

 
Nauru
Cities